Lucia Joas (née Anger, born 26 January 1991 in Oberstdorf) is a German cross-country skier.

Joas competed at the 2014 Winter Olympics for Germany. She placed 31st in the qualifying round in the sprint, failing to advance to the knockout stages.

As of April 2014, her best showing at the World Championships is 42nd, in the classical 10 kilometres in 2011.

Joas made her World Cup debut in November 2009. As of April 2014, her best finish is sixth, in a freestyle sprint race at Oberhof in the 2013–14. Her best World Cup overall finish is 60th, in 2013–14. Her best World Cup finish in a discipline is 34th, in the sprint in 2013–14.

Cross-country skiing results
All results are sourced from the International Ski Federation (FIS).

Olympic Games

World Championships

World Cup

Season standings

References

External links
 
 
 
 

1991 births
Living people
German female cross-country skiers
Olympic cross-country skiers of Germany
Cross-country skiers at the 2014 Winter Olympics
People from Oberstdorf
Sportspeople from Swabia (Bavaria)
21st-century German women